"Treading Water" is a song by Swedish singer Christoffer Kläfford, winner of the Swedish version of Idol in its thirteenth season in 2017. The song was released as a digital download in Sweden on 15 December 2017 through Universal Music Group. It was released on Kläfford's EP with the same name. The song was subsequently certified platinum in Sweden.

Track listing

Charts

Release history

References

2017 debut singles
2017 songs
Universal Music Group singles